Habacuc may refer to:

Habakkuk, prophet in the Hebrew Bible
Guillermo Vargas, artist